The Someșul Rece (Hungarian: Hideg-Szamos; literally "Cold Someș") is the right headwater of the river Someșul Mic in Romania. It joins the Someșul Cald (Warm Someş) in Lake Gilău, a reservoir near Gilău.

References

 Poze Somesul Rece - Bigmarry's photos 

Rivers of Romania
Rivers of Cluj County